"Aunt Betty" is a single by American alt-rock band Middle Class Rut. It was released as the first single from their second album Pick Up Your Head. The song was an instant download with an iTunes pre-order of their second album Pick Up Your Head. The music video premiered April 26, 2013 on Loudwire.

Chart performance

Personnel
Zack Lopez – vocals, electric guitar, bass guitar
Sean Stockham - vocals, drums
Dave Sardy - mixing

References

2013 singles
2013 songs
Middle Class Rut songs